Joanna Catherine Cherry  (born 18 March 1966) is a Scottish politician and lawyer serving as the Member of Parliament (MP) for Edinburgh South West since 2015. A member of the Scottish National Party (SNP), she was the party's Shadow Home Secretary and Shadow Secretary of State for Justice in the House of Commons from 2015 to 2021.

Education and early career 
Cherry was born on 18 March 1966 to Mary Margaret (née Haslette) and Thomas Alastair Cherry. She was educated at Holy Cross primary school, then at St Margaret's Convent School in Edinburgh and the University of Edinburgh.

Following her graduation, Cherry worked as a research assistant with the Scottish Law Commission (1990) before practising as a solicitor with the Edinburgh legal firm Brodies WS until 1995. She also worked as a part-time tutor in constitutional law, family law and civil court practice at the University of Edinburgh from 1990 to 1996.

Cherry was admitted as an advocate in 1995, with a particular interest in employment and industrial relations, health and safety, mental health, personal injury and professional negligence.

She served as a Standing Junior Counsel to the Scottish Government from 2003 to 2008, and as an Advocate Depute and Senior Advocate Depute from 2008 until 2011. She was appointed a Queen's Counsel in 2009 (becoming a King's Counsel on the death of Elizabeth II) and was an advocate with the Arnot Manderson stable within the Faculty of Advocates until her election to parliament.

Political career

2014 independence referendum 
Cherry set up the "Lawyers for Yes" group, which campaigned for a "Yes" (pro-independence) vote in the 2014 Scottish independence referendum.

2015 election to Westminster 
In February 2015, she was adopted as the Scottish National Party (SNP) candidate for Edinburgh South West in the May 2015 United Kingdom general election. She won the seat, which she then held in the subsequent June 2017 general election although with a reduced majority of just over 1,000 votes, making her seat the most marginal in Edinburgh at the time. Following her election, Cherry was appointed as the SNP spokesperson for Justice and Home Affairs at Westminster.

In September 2016, she issued an apology after defending a comedy rap group Witsherface performance at a pro-independence event that had been criticised as homophobic. The performance had called Conservative leader Ruth Davidson "Dykey' D" and had portrayed her making her inappropriate comments towards SNP MP Mhairi Black.

In May 2017, Cherry apologised for telling journalists that a nurse, who had told a TV debate audience she had been unable to survive on her salary and had to use food banks, was suspected to be the wife of a Conservative councillor. False claims about Claire Austin were retweeted by other SNP politicians and the nurse experienced online and offline harassment.

In October 2017, she was an observer at the 2017 Catalan independence referendum.

In May 2019, executives from Facebook and Twitter appeared before the Parliamentary Joint Committee on Human Rights, of which Cherry was a member,  and faced accusations over the way they handled abuse and harassment of parliamentarians on social media. Cherry cited several abusive tweets, that were not removed swiftly by Twitter, something the company's head of UK government, public policy and philanthropy, Katy Minshall, described as "absolutely an undesirable situation". Following the meeting, Cherry received police protection whilst attending her constituency surgery, having received a death threat sent via social media.

Following a High Court ruling in May 2019, in favour of The Daily Telegraph, The Independent Parliamentary Standards Authority released figures confirming that 377 MPs had had their parliamentary credit cards suspended for "late, incomplete or incorrect expenses claims since 2015". Cherry was included on that list, with the paper reporting that she had had her official credit card repeatedly suspended for failing to repay money on time.

On 11 May 2019 The Times reported that Cherry was being investigated by the House of Commons over bullying complaints from four former employees. Cherry rejected the allegations, and alleged that they were part of a politically motivated 'smear' campaign, from those within the SNP ranks who opposed her and her views. One former staff member took the complaint forward, alleging that Cherry both condoned bullying by her office manager and partook in bullying behaviour herself. Cherry was exonerated by the Parliamentary Commissioner for Standards, and given leave to issue a statement to that effect – "I'm pleased to be able to advise that I have been exonerated after an independent investigation into complaints that I had either condoned or been engaged in bullying within my constituency office. As I predicted, the allegations have not been upheld."

Cherry was the leading litigant in the Scottish court case challenging the five-week prorogation of Parliament by Prime Minister Boris Johnson. Her case Cherry v Advocate General for Scotland, together with a case brought in England and Wales by Gina Miller, was ultimately successful in the Supreme Court, resulting in the quashing of the prorogation on 24 September 2019.

2019 election-onwards 
Cherry was re-elected as MP for Edinburgh South West in the 2019 general election, with an increased majority of nearly 12,000.

In February 2020, Cherry announced that she was seeking nomination from the SNP Edinburgh Central constituency branch to run as the candidate for Edinburgh Central in the Scottish Parliament and would stand down as an MP in the House of Commons if elected. Angus Robertson also announced his intention to seek nomination for the Edinburgh Central constituency. In July 2020, Cherry announced she was ruling out a bid for Holyrood, stating that the conditions for standing as an MSP were unreasonable and made a fair contest impossible.

Cherry was sacked from the SNP's front bench on 1 February 2021 by the party leadership. Cherry tweeted: "Despite hard work, results and a strong reputation I've been sacked today from the SNP front bench." The party's Westminster leader Ian Blackford said: "Team working and cooperation are key to ensure results and this reshuffle will give us a strong team to take us forward." An SNP spokesman said in a statement: "Joanna Cherry was removed from the front bench because of unacceptable behaviour, which did not meet the standards expected of a front bench spokesperson – not because of the views she holds."

On 21 February 2021, Cherry was criticised by the Scottish branch of PEN International for her attempts to silence critics who questioned her by threatening defamation action. After Cherry disputed she had taken legal action, letters from her solicitors on her behalf were published. Jo Maugham, with whom she had worked on the legal challenge over Boris Johnson's prorogation of Parliament, said "Because defending defamation proceedings is so expensive, a well-funded claimant can bully critics into silence and, by marking the threats 'confidential', suppress transparency over the fact they are doing so. This feels profoundly wrong to me."

On 26 March 2021, Cherry announced that she would step back from her public duties for health reasons. On 10 May 2021, following the 2021 Scottish Parliament election, she began a gradual return to her public activities.

On 31 May 2021, she resigned from the SNP national executive committee.

In July 2022, Cherry was elected as the chair of the Parliamentary Joint Committee on Human Rights, having previously served as the deputy chair.

SNP leadership election 2023 

Following Nicola Sturgeon's announcement on 15 February 2023, that she would step down, during the  SNP leadership contest, Cherry was one of the few SNP parliamentarians to endorse Ash Regan, and introduced her at her campaign launch. 

On 13 Febuary, Cherry called for SNP chief executive Peter Murrell, husband of outgoing party leader Sturgeon, to step down during the contest.: he stepped down on 17 March over a dispute around publication of membership numbers.

Electoral history

Political positions

Scottish independence 
Cherry supports both Scottish independence and a proposed second Scottish independence referendum. She has been described as a more hardline supporter of independence, advocating a less cautious approach towards holding a second referendum than Nicola Sturgeon, including the holding a referendum even if the Scottish government could not come to an agreement with the British government over such a referendum. She has stated that she believes emulating the Irish First Dáil could be a path forward for the Scottish independence movement, stating that "One hundred years ago, Irish independence came about not as a result of a referendum but as a result of a treaty negotiated between Irish parliamentarians and the British Government after nationalist MPs had won the majority of Irish seats in the 1918 general election and withdrawn to form a provisional government in Dublin."  She has additionally denied that she advocates for illegally holding a referendum.

Alex Salmond 
During the Alex Salmond scandal concerning accusations of sexual harassment against former SNP leader and First Minister Alex Salmond, Cherry was described as one of his allies in the party and a critic of current SNP leader Nicola Sturgeon. Before the trial, Cherry told Holyrood that "Alex is my friend, and I was brought up to stand by my friends. It's the kind of family I come from. Alex is clear that he's innocent and I respect that." In March 2020, after Salmond was acquitted in court, she called for a public inquiry into the SNP's handling of the accusations against him. She later called for him to be reinstated to the party. In February 2021, she called for the government to release documents which Salmond claimed proved that Sturgeon and her allies had conspired against him.

In March 2021, when Salmond formed the Alba Party, she denied speculation that she would be defecting along with him.

Foreign policy 
In October 2021, Cherry criticised the Biden administration's actions during the withdrawal of troops from Afghanistan and the Fall of Kabul, and urged Prime Minister Boris Johnson to help the refugees fleeing the Taliban.

European Union 
Cherry supported Remain during the 2016 United Kingdom European Union membership referendum and has supported an independent Scotland joining the European Union. In March 2019, she announced she would be proposing a motion to force the government to revoke Article 50 if the UK was due to leave in a No Deal Brexit on 10 April that year.

In July 2020, she called for the SNP to stop fighting against Brexit, stating that "we lost the battle and Brexit is now an irreversible reality."

Position on transgender rights 
Cherry has opposed proposed reforms of the Gender Recognition Act in Scotland which would allow transgender people to obtain a Gender Recognition Certificate on the basis of a statutory declaration, replacing the current system that requires interview by a bureaucratic panel and medical reports. She signed the SNP Women's Pledge, which originated amongst members of the SNP but is not affiliated with it and which opposes the reforms.

Cherry has denied accusations of transphobia, stating that she approaches the issue "as a feminist" and that there was a "big dose of misogyny" in debates over Gender Recognition Act reform. She said that the statement "women don't have penises" is an "undeniable biological fact". She has stated that she has faced abuse over her position and that sections of the SNP with opposing views have "engaged in performative histrionics redolent of the Salem witch trials".

In January 2021, she supported an amendment to the Hate Crime and Public Order (Scotland) Act 2021 that would have exempted "criticism of matters relating to transgender identity" from violating provisions relating to protected characteristics in the bill. Later that month, she was criticised by SNP colleague Kirsty Blackman, after attacking and threatening to sue the party's LGBT wing, who had been critical of her defence of Sarah Phillimore, who had been banned from Twitter for allegedly making transphobic and antisemitic statements. In June, she signalled her support for For Women Scotland campaigner Marion Millar, who was charged under the Malicious Communications Act 1988, with a hate-crime aggravator, for allegedly transphobic and homophobic social media posts. Later that month, Cherry announced that she was returning to the bar to defend Millar in court. The case was subsequently dropped by prosecutors.

Writing in The National in June 2021, Cherry stated that some veteran members of the LGBT+ community no longer felt welcome at Pride events due to their views on transgender rights, claimed that LGBT+ rights charity Stonewall's workplace inclusion schemes misrepresent the law, and stated her belief that "many same-sex attracted women and those who hold gender-critical beliefs have found themselves in a relationship of coercive control with employers, service providers and membership organisations". In response a letter to the editor was published in the National, from the Director of LGBT charity Equality Network, Tim Hopkins, disputing Cherry's position.

In November 2021, Cherry was accused of "justifying conversion therapy" for transgender people after she tweeted that a ban on conversion therapy "must not make it a criminal offence for therapists to try to help patients with gender dysphoria to feel comfortable in their birth sex". In the days following her comments the SNP's official LGBTQ+ wing, Out for Independence, and SNP Students both called for party leadership to remove the whip from Cherry, and for an independent investigation into transphobia in the SNP. When her position was criticised by the Equality Network, one of Scotland's national LGBTI charities, Cherry called for a Scottish Government investigation into the charity and for Shona Robison, the Cabinet Secretary for Social Justice, to make it clear to the charity that its behaviour was inappropriate for a government-funded organisation.

In August 2022, in a public letter to Jason Leitch, the national clinical director for the Scottish government, Cherry argued that trans young people "must be treated like any other children with psychological problems" and called for Scotland's only gender identity clinic to be closed. In October 2022, The Daily Telegraph reported that, with fellow "gender critical" parliamentarians Rosie Duffield and Anne Jenkin, Baroness Jenkin of Kennington, she was setting up a cross-party "biology policy unit", "to help ensure policies across the public sector that are based on gender identity theory are documented and scrutinised".

Personal life 
Cherry lists her personal interests as travel, reading and swimming. She is a lesbian.

References

External links 

 
Profile on SNP website

1966 births
Living people
21st-century Scottish women politicians
21st-century Scottish politicians
Alumni of the University of Edinburgh
Female members of the Parliament of the United Kingdom for Scottish constituencies
LGBT members of the Parliament of the United Kingdom
Scottish LGBT politicians
Members of the Faculty of Advocates
Members of the Parliament of the United Kingdom for Edinburgh constituencies
Politicians from Edinburgh
Scottish National Party MPs
Scottish King's Counsel
UK MPs 2015–2017
UK MPs 2017–2019
UK MPs 2019–present
Lesbian politicians
Scottish women lawyers
20th-century Scottish lawyers
21st-century Scottish lawyers
People educated at St Margaret's School, Edinburgh
20th-century women lawyers
21st-century women lawyers
20th-century Scottish women
Feminism and transgender
Lesbian feminists
Scottish feminists
21st-century King's Counsel